Elhadji Malick Tall (born 25 January 1995) is a Senegalese professional footballer who plays as a striker for  club Ansar.

After playing for three seasons in Jordan, first for Al-Wehdat and then for Al-Ahli, he joined Lebanese side Ansar in 2017. He was the top scorer in the Lebanese Premier League in his first two seasons, scoring 15 and 20 goals respectively. In 2020, Tall joined Al-Riyadh in Saudi Arabia, where he was the Saudi Second Division top scorer with 22 goals in 2020–21. He returned to Ansar in 2022.

Club career

Al-Wehdat
Tall played for Jordanian team Al-Wehdat for two seasons, scoring 15 league goals in total (eight in the first season and seven in the second). On 10 March 2015, he scored his first AFC Cup goal against Saudi club Al-Nahda in the group stage. His first AFC Champions League goal came one year later, on 9 February 2016, in a 2–1 loss to Al-Ittihad.

Al-Ahli Amman
In 2016, Tall joined Syrian club Al-Ahli on a one-year contract after having played with Al-Wehdat for two years. On 30 December 2016, he scored a hat-trick in a 4–0 win against Al-Baqa'a. On 6 March 2017, he scored his first AFC Cup goal for his team in a 1–1 draw to Al-Zawra'a. He ended the 2016–17 season as the league's joint second top scorer, scoring nine goals throughout the season.

Ansar

2017–18 season
On 26 July 2017, it was announced that Tall had joined Lebanese club Ansar. On 17 September 2017, he scored on his league debut against Tripoli in a 5–1 away win. His first league brace, hat-trick and haul came simultaneously against Nejmeh on 2 October 2017, scoring four goals in a 5–1 away win. On 27 February 2018 he scored his first AFC Cup goal for Ansar, in a 1–3 home loss against Jordanian side Al-Faisaly.

He scored a total of 15 league goals in 22 games, making him the top scorer of the 2017–18 season. He was also part of the 2017–18 Lebanese Premier League Team of the Season for his performances.

2018–19 season
In August 2018, Tall signed for Saudi Arabian club Ohod for $120,000 on a three-year contract. However, Tall was forced to return back to Ansar, as Ohod had capped their foreign player quota by having completed the transfer of another player.

On his first league game of the season, played on 21 September 2018, he scored a goal against Nejmeh in a 4–2 away loss. He scored three consecutive braces in three league games, from 4 to 25 November 2018, against Chabab Ghazieh, Bekaa and Tripoli, scoring six of Ansar's nine goals in those games. On 15 February 2019, in Beirut Municipal Stadium's first game in over two years, Tall scored a brace against Salam Zgharta. On 19 May 2019, Tall scored against Akhaa Ahli in the Lebanese FA Cup semi-final in a 2–1 win, helping his team reach the final.

Tall finished the season as the league top scorer for the second time in a row, with 20 goals in 20 appearances. He became only the fourth player to retain the Golden Boot in the Lebanese Premier League. Tall also scored three goals in the Lebanese FA Cup, bringing his total seasonal tally to 22. He was included in the 2018–19 Lebanese Premier League Team of the Season.

2019–20 season 
Tall scored four goals in the 2019–20 season's first three games. In the 2020 AFC Cup, Tall scored a brace, his first in the AFC Cup, against Al-Faisaly on 24 February 2020. After scoring in the first half, Tall scored a 96th minute penalty to help his side win 4–3. On 13 March 2020, Ansar terminated Tall's contract due to administrative issues within the club.

Al-Riyadh
On 15 September 2020, Tall joined Saudi Second Division club Al-Riyadh; he reunited with former Ansar teammate Houssem Louati. Tall finished the season as the league top scorer, with 22 goals in the 2020–21 season. He scored 17 goals in the following season.

Return to Ansar
On 1 July 2022, Tall returned to Ansar in the Lebanese Premier League ahead of the 2022–23 season.

Honours
Al-Wehdat
 Jordanian Pro League: 2014–15, 2015–16
 Jordan Super Cup runner up: 2015, 2016

Ansar
 Lebanese FA Cup runner up: 2018–19
 Lebanese Elite Cup runner up: 2019, 2022
 Lebanese Super Cup runner up: 2017, 2019

Individual
 Lebanese Premier League Team of the Season: 2017–18, 2018–19
 Lebanese Premier League top scorer: 2017–18, 2018–19
 Lebanese FA Cup top scorer: 2018–19
 Lebanese Elite Cup top scorer: 2022
 Saudi Second Division top scorer: 2020–21

References

External links

 
 Elhadji Malick Tall at Eurosport
 
 

1995 births
Living people
People from Dakar Region
Senegalese footballers
Association football forwards
Al-Wehdat SC players
Al-Ahli SC (Amman) players
Al Ansar FC players
Ohod Club players
Al-Riyadh SC players
Jordanian Pro League players
Lebanese Premier League players
Saudi Second Division players
Senegalese expatriate footballers
Expatriate footballers in Jordan
Expatriate footballers in Lebanon
Expatriate footballers in Saudi Arabia
Senegalese expatriate sportspeople in Jordan
Senegalese expatriate sportspeople in Lebanon
Senegalese expatriate sportspeople in Saudi Arabia
Lebanese Premier League top scorers